Feleti Fakaongo (born 16 August 1970 in Vava'u) is a Tongan former rugby union player. He played as lock and flanker.

Career
His first cap for Tonga was against Scotland, at Nuku'alofa, on 5 June 1993. He was also part of the 1995 Rugby World Cup squad, playing only against Ivory Coast in the tournament. His last international cap was against Samoa, at Nuku'alofa, on 15 June 2002.
At club level he played for King Country and North Harbour in the National Provincial Championship in New Zealand, as well for FC Grenoble, Bordeaux-Begles Oyonnax RugbyRC Chalon and ROC La Voulte-Valence in France.

Notes

External links

Alifeleti Fakaongo at New Zealand Rugby History
Feleti Fakaongo European competition stats

Tongan rugby union players
Rugby union locks
Rugby union flankers
Tonga international rugby union players
Tongan expatriate sportspeople  in New Zealand
Tongan expatriate sportspeople  in Japan
Tongan expatriate sportspeople in France
1970 births
Living people
People from Vavaʻu
King Country rugby union players
North Harbour rugby union players
FC Grenoble players
Oyonnax Rugby players
CA Bordeaux-Bègles Gironde players
Expatriate rugby union players in France
Expatriate rugby union players in New Zealand
Expatriate rugby union players in Japan
Tongan expatriate rugby union players